Mayra Aide García Lopez (born May 16, 1972 in Tecate, Baja California) is a beach volleyball player from Mexico, who won the silver medal in the women's beach team competition at the 2003 Pan American Games in Santo Domingo, Dominican Republic, partnering Hilda Gaxiola. She represented her native country at the 2004 Summer Olympics in Athens, Greece and also at the 2008 Summer Olympics with her current partner Bibiana Candelas.

References

External links
 
 
 

1972 births
Living people
People from Mazatlán
Sportspeople from Sinaloa
Mexican beach volleyball players
Women's beach volleyball players
Beach volleyball players at the 2004 Summer Olympics
Beach volleyball players at the 2008 Summer Olympics
Olympic beach volleyball players of Mexico
Beach volleyball players at the 2003 Pan American Games
Beach volleyball players at the 2007 Pan American Games
Beach volleyball players at the 2011 Pan American Games
Sportspeople from Tijuana
Pan American Games silver medalists for Mexico
Pan American Games bronze medalists for Mexico
Pan American Games medalists in volleyball
Central American and Caribbean Games gold medalists for Mexico
Competitors at the 2002 Central American and Caribbean Games
Central American and Caribbean Games medalists in beach volleyball
Medalists at the 2011 Pan American Games
21st-century Mexican women